Van Os is a Dutch toponymic surname meaning "from Oss", a town in North Brabant. Variant spellings are Van Osch and Van Oss.  Notable people with the surname include:

Van Os / VanOs
Arie van Os (born 1937), Dutch businessman and financial director
Ben van Os (1944–2012), Dutch production designer and art director
David Van Os (born 1950), American lawyer and politician
Dirck van Os (1556–1615), Dutch businessman, c-founder of the Amsterdam Exchange Bank and the United East India Company (VOC)
Georgius Jacobus Johannes van Os (1782–1861), Dutch still life painter, son of Jan van Os
Jan van Os (1744–1808), Dutch painter known for his fruit and flower still lives
Jim van Os (born 1960), Dutch psychiatrist and epidemiologist
Joanne van Os (born 1955), Australian author and former wife of Rod Ansell
Maria Margaretha van Os (1779–1862), Dutch flower painter, daughter of Jan van Os
Nick Vanos (1963–1987), American basketball player
Pieter van Os (1776–1839), Dutch animal and landscape painter and engraver, son of Jan van Os
Pieter Frederik van Os (1808–1892), Dutch animal and landscape painter, son of Pieter van Os
Rosa de Vries-van Os (1828–1889), Dutch operatic soprano
Sussanna van Os née de la Croix (1755–1789), Dutch painter, wife of Jan van Os
Ton van Os (born 1941), Dutch etcher, sculptor, painter, and mosaicist
Willibrord van Os (1744–1825), Dutch Old Catholic Archbishop of Utrecht

Van Osch
Henri van Osch (1945–2001), Dutch swimmer
Kalia Van Osch (born 1993), Canadian curler
Kesa Van Osch (born 1991), Canadian curler
Ton van Osch (born 1955), Dutch military commander, Director General of the European Union Military Staff 2010-2013
Yanick van Osch (born 1997), Dutch football goalkeeper

See also
Van Oss polygon and Van Oss apeirogon, named after the Dutch mathematician Salomon Levi van Oss (1864–1937)

References

Dutch-language surnames
Surnames of Dutch origin
Toponymic surnames